Caitlin Maxwell (born 2 May 1999) is an English sabre fencer.

She began fencing at the age of 8, at school and at her local club in Truro.

She has won the British sabre national title on six occasions at the British Fencing Championships from 2016 to 2022.

References

British female sabre fencers
Living people
1999 births